Rivervale is an unincorporated community in Bono Township, Lawrence County, Indiana.

Rivervale was named from its setting on the East Fork of the White River.

Geography

References

Unincorporated communities in Lawrence County, Indiana
Unincorporated communities in Indiana